Whisky Bar or Whiskey Bar can refer to
 Whisky Bar, a bar in the Sunset Marquis Hotel
 Whisky a Go Go, a bar in California sometimes referred to as "The Whisky"
 "Alabama Song (Whisky Bar)", a song notably covered by The Doors and David Bowie
 Whiskey Bar, a weblog by Billmon